Amaravathi  is a 1993 Indian Tamil-language romance film directed by Selva. The film stars newcomers Ajith Kumar and Sanghavi. It was released on 4 June 1993 to a positive response at the box office.

Plot 
An old couple are heartbroken because their only daughter runs away with her lover. At that time they see Amravathi (Sanghavi) who is a naive and beautiful girl who runs away from home but does not remember anything else. They decide to take to the police but instead want to raise her as their own daughter. she finds shelter in their  house where she is well taken care of. Her life takes a turn when Arjun (Ajith Kumar) son of a rich business man falls in love with her. Arjun finds excuses to meet her in her house and gets well known with the family. One day with the help of Amravati's friend he manages to lure her into his house without her parents knowing and expresses his love to her and starts taking her to places and they start having the most happiest days of their life. But her foster father fears she will elope too so forbids her to see Arjun but her father understands that they are deeply in love with each other. Just then a newspaper shows there is a missing girl called Angeline and she bears resemblance to Amravati. Arjun sees this and thinks it is Amravati. Just then a doctor comes and recognises Amravati as Angeline and tells Arjun and her foster parents she is Angeline the daughter of a rich businessman. She and her father both never got over the loss of her mother and her uncle tortures them to give him the wealth and Angeline's hand in marriage and makes sure they tell nobody about him., Her father and her decide to kill themselves so the can escape the torture. Her father dies but Angel survives and has amnesia and has forgotten everything. Then the uncle kidnaps Amravati to force her into marriage and also tries to misbehave with her just then Arjun fights him and rescues her. Arjun and Amravati live happy and also it is shown nobody ever told Amravati about her past because they did not want to upset her.

Cast

Production 
After the success of Thalaivasal, Selva began a love story featuring newcomers. The producers were unhappy with the work of the newcomers and they soon approached Ajith Kumar to play the lead role. The original lead actor was later demoted to play Ajith Kumar's friend in the film. Ajith signed the film on 3 August 1992, making his debut in Tamil as a lead actor. Similarly, the lead actress Sanghavi was just 16 when the film started production. As the film went into post production, Ajith was bed-ridden due to a racing injury and remained in treatment for twenty months. Subsequently, another actor Vikram had to dub scenes for Ajith.

Music 

The music is composed by Bala Bharathi and the lyrics written by Vairamuthu.

Release and reception 
Amaravathi was released on 4 June 1993. Malini Mannath wrote for The Indian Express, "Producer Chozha Ponnurangan and writer-director Chelvaa [...] come together again in [Amaravathi], which despite its flaws, is a fairly engaging entertainer that has romance, suspense and sentiments in the proper proportions."

The film was profitable and the success was partly credited to the chart-topping soundtracks composed by Bala Bharathi. The film also gained media attention for its lead actor, Ajith, who was approached with several modelling assignments.

References

External links 
 

1993 films
1990s Tamil-language films
Indian romance films
Films directed by Selva (director)
1993 romance films